Abputi Gelal (also Romanized as Ābpūtī Gelāl; also known as Ābpūtī) is a village in Chin Rural District, Ludab District, Boyer-Ahmad County, Kohgiluyeh and Boyer-Ahmad Province, Iran. At the 2006 census, its population was 21, in 4 families.

References 

Populated places in Boyer-Ahmad County